Intense Tropical Cyclone Indlala was a powerful tropical cyclone that struck northeastern Madagascar in March 2007. The ninth named storm and fifth intense tropical cyclone of the 2006–07 South-West Indian Ocean cyclone season, Indlala developed on March 3, 2007 southwest of the Chagos archipelago in the central Indian Ocean. Initially a tropical disturbance, Indlala moved generally westward in its formative stages, attaining tropical cyclone status on March 13. Early on March 15, the cyclone made landfall in northeastern Madagascar on the Masoala Peninsula near Antalaha, still at its peak intensity according to the MFR. Indlala rapidly weakened over land and turned southward, eventually re-emerging into the Indian Ocean on March 18; it was last noted by the MFR on March 19.

The cyclone struck Madagascar a few months after the country experienced a series of deadly floods and other cyclones. Indlala killed 150 people and injured another 126. Monetary damage was estimated at over US$240 million. Severe flooding, strong winds, and heavy rainfall wrecked cities in the immediate vicinity of its landfall point. Farther inland and along the country's northwest coast, flooding cut access to roads, which disrupted the response to the storm. Individuals, national governments, United Nations agencies, and the International Federation of Red Cross and Red Crescent Societies helped residents affected by the cyclone cope with its aftermath.

Meteorological history

The Intertropical Convergence Zone spawned an area of convection, or thunderstorms, on March 9, located southwest of the Chagos archipelago in the central Indian Ocean. A circulation developed within the system, situated in a favorable area of low wind shear beneath an anticyclone. On March 10, the Météo-France meteorological office in Réunion (MFR) designated the system as Tropical Disturbance 12. On the same day, the American-based Joint Typhoon Warning Center (JTWC) issued a Tropical Cyclone Formation Alert, after a further increase in convection. The nascent system moved generally westward, steered by a ridge over the Mascarene Islands. On March 11, the MFR upgraded the system to Tropical Depression 12, after an expansion of outflow and an increase in banding features. A day later, the MFR upgraded the system to a tropical storm, naming it Indlada first, before correcting the name to Indlala. Also on March 12, the JTWC initiated advisories on the system, designating it Tropical Cyclone 19S.

With favorable atmospheric conditions, Indlala continued to strengthen as its convection organized, becoming a severe tropical storm late on March 12. A trough over South Africa disrupted the ridge, causing the storm to turn toward the southwest. On March 13, the MFR upgraded Indlala to tropical cyclone status – with 10–minute sustained winds of at least , the equivalent of a hurricane. A small, well-defined eye formed in the center of the storm as it approached northeastern Madagascar.

Indlala underwent an eyewall replacement cycle around the time of its peak intensity. Around 00:00 UTC on March 15, the cyclone made landfall in northeastern Madagascar on the Masoala Peninsula near Antalaha, still at its peak intensity according to the MFR. Indlala rapidly weakened as it progressed inland. The JTWC discontinued advisories on March 16, by which time the MFR had downgraded the cyclone to a tropical depression. The system moved southward through Madagascar, eventually re-emerging into the Indian Ocean on March 18 near Manambondro. The weak system continued to the south-southeast, and was last noted by the MFR on March 19.

Impact

In its formative stages, Indlala passed north of the sparsely-populated St. Brandon. Rainfall on the island reached , and winds reached . Later, the storm passed south of Agaléga, producing gusts of  there.

Indlala was the fifth tropical cyclone to hit or affect Madagascar in the span of three months, after Bondo, Clovis, Favio, and Gamede. The series of floods diminished the country's stock of supplies from United Nations agencies, spurring an appeal for international assistance and a declaration of a national emergency. Across northern Madagascar, Cyclone Indlala dropped heavy rainfall and produced hurricane-force wind gusts. At Antalaha near where it moved ashore, a station recorded  of rainfall over 24 hours. Antsohihy in northern Madagascar recorded  of rainfall over 48 hours. The cyclone killed 150 people across Madagascar, with another 126 injured. Damage in the country was estimated at over US$240 million.

Across Madagascar, Indlala damaged or destroyed 54,000 houses, leaving 188,331 people homeless. Houses with iron roofs fared better than traditionally built houses. The regions of Madagascar hardest hit by Indlala were Diana, Analanjirofo, Atsinanana, Atsimo-Atsinanana, and Vatovavy-Fitovinany along the country's east coast; Sava, Sofia, and Boeny along the northwest coast; and the inland regions of Betsiboka and Alaotra-Mangoro. Indlala affected vital institutions, with 228 schools and 71 hospitals damaged to some degree. High winds and heavy rainfall damaged roads in northern Madagascar, with 103 bridges damaged, while landslides blocked access to some communities. Throughout Madagascar, the cyclone wrecked about  worth of crops.

Flooding from Indlala affected a  area of northern Madagascar, notably in the cities of Antalaha, Maroantsetra, and Sambava, where the cyclone severed phone lines and caused power outages. In Maroantsetra, the cyclone destroyed the roof of a prison; ten prisoners escaped, and three were re-arrested. Rising rivers forced families to flee their homes and gather in the city hall. Small communities lost radio contact for two days. Most of the water wells in Maroantsetra were contaminated, leaving 25,000 people without access to clean drinking water. North of its landfall point, Indlala wrecked about 40% of Antalaha's buildings. The storm washed away boats, blew away roofs, contaminated wells, and decimated crops. The local vanilla crop was finally starting to mature after Cyclone Gafilo's destructive landfall in 2004. Indlala wrecked about 90% of the vanilla orchids in and around Antalaha, and about 80% of the country's vanilla production. East of the country's capital Antananarivo, the cyclone damaged a power station, causing power outages. In Sofia region in northwest Madagascar, floods were the region's worst since 1959. Flooding in Diana and Sofia regions killed 95 people, with 20,000 people left homeless.

Aftermath

Outages in the road and communication network disrupted damage assessments and aid distribution. Members of the Red Cross worked with volunteers and Malagasy officials to respond to the cyclone, including disaster assessment and inspecting water systems. A team of 160 volunteers and Red Cross members provided meals to more than 55,000 people. Helicopters airdropped food and supplies to 202 families in isolated areas. The price of rice rose after the storm, with a 5% increase in the cost of the makalioka variety by March 19. Residents who lost their houses in Ambario rebuilt in nearby Marovantaza.

The Red Cross launched an appeal for just over US$2 million to fund the agency's response in the country through the end of December 2007; much of the funds were covered by the British and Swedish governments, with nine national Red Cross organizations funding the rest. Teams with the organization Medair disinfected water wells and provided cleaning supplies to households. Helicopters and trucks delivered emergency goods to residents in Sofia region. The Malagasy government appealed citizens for private donations on March 29. A few weeks after Indlala struck, Cyclone Jaya also hit northeast Madagascar, further disrupting the response to the cyclone. In April 2007, the United Nations Disaster Assessment and Coordination sent a team to help coordinate the local and international response to Madagascar's series of cyclones. The series of storms left about 150,000 children unable to attend school, although most of them were able to return after Easter break in early April. After the series of floods, the World Food Programme allocated US$1 million worth of food, in which the agency distributed more than 733 metric tons (MT) of food through other agencies. The WFP and UNICEF together airlifted 58,900 people with more than 131 MT worth of food. The initial emergency period after cyclones Indlala and Jaya concluded by June 2007, as the needs shifted toward reconstruction.

As an immediate response to Indlala, the American embassy in Antananarivo released US$100,000 for urgent relief operations, and Germany sent €22,000 to help storm victims. The European Parliament granted €1.5 million in humanitarian assistance to help with food insecurity. France donated €700,000 in assistance to the WFP and Groupe de Recherches et d'Echanges Technologiques. The French Red Cross deployed its helicopter cruiser  with 40 MT of emergency supplies, along with a tam four disaster management experts to assist the Malagasy Red Cross. Nearby Comoros donated 500 MT of rice. Food for Peace sent 2,000 MT of food, worth US$1.5 million.

See also

Cyclone Ivan – powerful cyclone that struck Madagascar slightly to the south of Indlala in 2008
Cyclone Bingiza – cyclone that struck Madagascar near where Indlala hit in 2011

References

Cyclones in Madagascar
2006–07 South-West Indian Ocean cyclone season
Cyclone Indlala
Intense Tropical Cyclones
Tropical cyclones in 2007